Callistege triangula is a moth of the family Erebidae first described by William Barnes and James Halliday McDunnough in 1918. It is found in North America, where it has been recorded from Arizona, New Mexico and Texas.

The wingspan is about 30 mm. Adults are on wing from August to September.

References

Moths described in 1918
Callistege
Moths of North America